The Qarabağ 2006–07 season was Qarabağ's 14th Azerbaijan Premier League season. They finished the season in 8th place, were knocked out of the Azerbaijan Cup at the last 16 stage by Neftchi Baku and didn't progress beyond the First qualifying round of the UEFA Cup after losing to Zimbru Chişinău. Qarabağ started the season under the management of Boyukagha Aghayev, but he was replaced by Rasim Kara in December 2006 following the completion of the first half of the season.

Squad

Transfers

Summer

In:

 

Out:

Winter

In:

Out:

Competitions

Azerbaijan Premier League

Results
Source:

Table

Azerbaijan Cup

Source:

UEFA Cup

Squad statistics

Appearances and goals

|-
|colspan="14"|Players who appeared for Qarabağ that left during the season:

|}

Goal scorers

Notes
Qarabağ have played their home games at the Tofiq Bahramov Stadium since 1993 due to the ongoing situation in Quzanlı.

References

External links 
 Official Site
 http://www.weltfussball.at/teams/fk-qarabag/2009/2/
 Qarabağ at Soccerway.com

Qarabağ FK seasons
Qarabag